Lisa Soraya Aziz (born 19 June 1962) is a British news presenter. She is best known as the presenter of the Morning News on LBC. Before this she worked for ITV Westcountry as a co-presenter for the evening news programme: The West Country Tonight. She later resigned from that post. She also presented the news on TV-am and Sky News, and was one of the first Asian presenters to be seen on television. In 2004, she was the recipient of an EMMA (Ethnic Multicultural Media Academy) award for Best Television News Journalist. Lisa currently presents the breakfast show on the UK's first 24-hour rolling news radio station LBC News.

Early life
Aziz was born in Totnes, Devon to a Bangladeshi father and an English mother. She graduated with a BA (Hons) in History of Art and Religious Studies from the University of London, after which she joined Radio City, in Liverpool, as a presenter. In 1983, she moved to Bristol where she worked as a television reporter and presenter for the BBC and HTV West.

Career
In 1988, Aziz joined TV-am as a reporter before presenting news bulletins for the station the following year. She was one of the first half-Asian presenters to be seen on mainstream television, and the first Muslim news presenter. She joined Sky News in 1992, but continued to present bulletins for TV-am, and later went on to become one of the main news presenters at Sky News. In 2004, she won the EMMA Best Television News Journalist Award. She returned to the West Country in 2005, and has since been one of the main presenters of the ITV West main news programme The West Tonight. From 16 February 2009, she became co-presenter of the pan-regional news programme The West Country Tonight, which replaced The West Tonight (ITV West) and Westcountry Live (ITV Westcountry) alongside Steve Scott.

In 1992 she was a contestant on Cluedo, teaming up with The Bill actor Kevin Lloyd, conceding to the winning team of Jenny Powell and Nigel Dempster.

In June 2009, Aziz was reported to have gone on leave from ITV West Country after suffering tendinitis.

In mid June 2009, Aziz disappeared from her presenting role, and was replaced by two younger female presenters, Ellie Barker (ITV West) and Claire Manning (ITV Westcountry).

Private Eye reported on 7 July. that Aziz, who by then had not been seen hosting nightly news programme The West Country Tonight for the past month, had been suspended for irregularities with her expenses, one of the irregular items apparently being a £5.75 bill for dry cleaning a child's top. According to the Daily Mirror the claims amounted to £200. It was later reported that she had initiated legal proceedings against her employers in response to the allegations, and had lodged complaints about four people at ITV West.

Aziz also said that she had not been suspended, but had been signed off work for three months due to stress caused by the expenses allegations. She also received treatment at the Priory Clinic for work-related stress and depression.

On Wednesday 24 February 2010, The Bristol Evening Post reported that Lisa Aziz had officially left ITV West and had dropped all allegations against the broadcaster.

She now lives in south London and works for Global Radio where she has previously read the morning news on LBC. She currently presents the breakfast programme on rolling news station LBC News.

Television
 HTV News (1984–1988)
 Good Morning Britain (1988–1992)
 QD: The Master Game (1991)
 Cluedo (1992)
 Sky News (1994–2005)
 The West Tonight (2005–2009)
 The West Country Tonight (2009)

Radio
 LBC Nick Ferrari
 Classic FM (UK)
 LBC News Breakfast programme.

Awards
In 2004, Aziz was awarded the EMMA Best Television News Journalist Award.

See also
British Bangladeshi
List of British Bangladeshis

References

External links

ITV West Profile
Sky News profile

1962 births
Living people
English Muslims
English people of Bangladeshi descent
ITV regional newsreaders and journalists
People from Totnes
Sky News newsreaders and journalists
Alumni of the University of London